A pipette stand is a holder designed to provide safe and convenient storage for manual and electronic pipettes. In particular, the stands for electronic pipettes can recharge the battery of the pipettes, typically by means of charging pins or connectors.
The design of the pipette stand can be:
 wall mount holder
 linear stand
 carousel stand
The main purpose of the use of pipette stand is to reduce the cross contamination risk between pipettes or from benchtop to your pipettes.

Smart pipette stand 

The term "smart" is related to the additional functionalities of the stand besides the storage and charging of pipettes. For example, from simply functionalities such as reading RFID and NFC labels to more complex such as to directly control electronic pipettes. In fact, smart pipette stands are equipped with microcontroller or embedded PC capable to communicate directly with electronic pipettes using wired (e.g. USB) or wireless technologies (e.g. Bluetooth).

References

External links 
 Pipettes of the future in News Medical Life Sciences
 Keep your bench organized with a pipette stand
 Laboratory Laboratory 4.0: Who needs it, and to what extent? by Labvolution

Laboratory equipment
Microbiology equipment
Volumetric instruments